The 2005 Bulgarian Cup Final was played at the Vasil Levski National Stadium in Sofia on 25 May 2005 and was contested between the sides of Levski Sofia and CSKA Sofia. The match was refereed by Anton Genov and was won by Levski Sofia. The win gave Levski their 24th Bulgarian Cup success.

Match

Details

References

External links
Info Match at fccska.com

Bulgarian Cup finals
PFC Levski Sofia matches
Cup Final
PFC CSKA Sofia matches